Lowry Park North is a neighborhood within the city limits of Tampa, Florida. As of the 2010 census the neighborhood had a population of 5,936. The ZIP Codes serving the neighborhood are 33604 and 33612. The elevation is 23 feet above sea level.

Geography
Lowry Park North boundaries are Forest Hills to the north, Carrollwood to the west, Sulphur Springs to the east and Lowry Park to the south.

Demographics
Source: Hillsborough County Atlas

As of the census of 2010, there were 5,936 people and 2,311 households residing in the neighborhood. The population density was 6,178/mi2. The racial makeup of the neighborhood was 65% White, 17% African American, 1% Native American, 5% Asian, 8% from other races, and 4% from two or more races. Hispanic or Latino of any race were 48% of the population.

There were 2,311 households, out of which 31% had children under the age of 18 living with them, 24% were married couples living together, 33% had a female householder with no husband present, and 10% were non-families. 28% of all households were made up of individuals.

In the neighborhood the population was spread out, with 25% under the age of 18, 26% from 18 to 34, 23% from 35 to 49, 18% from 50 to 64, and 9% who were 65 years of age or older. For every 100 females, there were 93.7 males.

The per capita income for the neighborhood was $13,963. About 21% of the population were below the poverty line.

Education
The schools that serve this area are as following:
Forest Hills Elementary
Twin Lakes Elementary
Adams Middle School
Chamberlain High School

See also
Neighborhoods in Tampa, Florida

References

External links
Lowry Park North Neighborhood Association 
Community Map of Lowry Park North

Neighborhoods in Tampa, Florida